Produce Pandas (fully stylized as  熊猫堂ProducePandas) is a Chinese boy group dubbed as "China's first plus-size boy band" formed and managed by DMDF Entertainment, which was set up under Simply Joy Music to specifically manage plus-sized groups. The group, consisting of five members: Chen Dingding(DING), Cui Yunfeng(Otter), Qi Ha(Husky), Shi Qijun(Mr. 17) and Ka Si(Cass), made their debut on July 28, 2020 with their single "La La La".

Background 
The idea for Produce Pandas came in 2018 when their parent label Simply Joy Music decided to form a boy group that breaks the "aesthetic stereotypes" perpetuated by the idol industry in an effort to create role models who are ordinary and relatable to their fans. The management noticed that idol groups in the market tend to have a lot of similarities in terms of physical build, style and temperament. This gives form to the stereotype that all idols have to be thin, young and fair-skinned. Produce Pandas aim to become idols centered around being more "rotund and approachable" instead of the cool and handsome demeanor sported by boy groups.

History

Formation and pre-debut activities 
Scouts and notices were sent out to recruit plus-sized men, and out of the approximate 300 candidates who auditioned, 5 were picked for the final lineup after months of testing and eliminations in the form of weekly, monthly and quarterly assessments.

The chosen members came from various backgrounds and gave up their jobs, ranging from Amazon customer service to petroleum refinery worker to start their full-time training for Produce Pandas, with their oldest member being 30 years old at the time of joining.

While three of the members have experience in singing, only one came from a dancing background. The group underwent intense "K-pop style" training in order to match the industry standards in terms of performance skills.

2020: Debut album A.S.I.A, first concert 
After their initial debut, they followed up with three more songs and then released their first album A.S.I.A on 15 October. It is their only album to have a music video for each song. It was originally intended to have the videos filmed at various places all over Asia, but due to the COVID-19 outbreak, many of the videos were filmed back in Beijing. The music video of Sui Sui Nian (碎碎念) was filmed in Bali, Indonesia.

On November 22, Produce Pandas held a concert in Chengdu.

On December 18, the group announced their fandom name (Panda Keeper), official group colour #FF0000 and individual members' official colours on a Weibo post.

2021: Youth with You, Stand Up EP, second album Emo了, national tour 
Produce Pandas competed on the third season of Chinese reality show Youth with You, where Ding and Otter managed to pass the first elimination before finishing at 52 and 42 respectively.

Shortly after the show on May 13, Produce Pandas released their single and music video "Dream".

Produce Pandas announced their first EP Stand Up, which was released on May 28 along with a music video for the title track two days later.

On July 28, Produce Pandas released a single "The ONE" for their one year anniversary, which came in a Chinese version and a Japanese version with a music video for both tracks, as well as their second concert on July 30 which featured their debut performance of "The ONE", in Beijing.

In September, their company teased the title track of their second studio album, to be revealed on September 28 as "Free Fall", with a music video following two days later. The album, Emo了, was announced to be released on October 15, featuring six new tracks and four selected tracks. Another track of the album, "Victims", received two music videos centered around NSSI (Non suicidal self injury) to raise awareness on issues of mental health and self-harm. A national tour was also announced with the album release, scheduled for Shanghai, Chengdu and Guangzhou, on 24 October, 30 October and 18 December, respectively. The Chengdu concert was initially postponed to 20 November, then cancelled altogether as a precaution due to a resurgence of COVID-19 cases in the area.

Produce Pandas performed on 23 October in the The Night of Unlimited Power live concert along "REAL ME·动感地带 2021来电之夜"  with other artists like Chris Lee and Mao BuYi.

2022: Singles Best of You, Cosmic Anthem and second Extended Play Love Best Before 
Produce Pandas released their second single Best of You (冲刺) on April 6.

On May 20, Produce Pandas took part in the 2022 Bilibili Dancing Festival by performing a vocal and dance cover of the official theme song Heartbeat Spectrum  The credits of that song hinted at a new member by the title of "Panda Trainee" as part of the backing vocals in the cover. 

During their livestream on May 29, Produce Pandas announced that they are releasing a new song on the 31st of May, revealed to be part of their second extended play Love Best Before, which would contain a mix of solo and group tracks. The five solo tracks were dropped over the span of three weeks until the official release of the full EP on June 21. The EP includes a solo track by the Panda Trainee, who was initially rumored to join the line up which lead to backlash from fans. Ray Xi, the group's agent, made an announcement regarding speculations of the alleged sixth member. The trainee, whose identity remains undisclosed, is said to be part of Produce Panda's "Panda Trainee system" where he will serve as a substitute member in the event of long term absence of a panda (such as from health issues or solo activities) for commercial events while still receiving support for long term development from the company.  

TEAM Entertainment, Produce Panda's japanese label, announced a single to be released on August 31st. The single's lead track includes Cosmic Anthem, sung in both chinese and japanese versions,  as well as 手紙 Tegami, a japanese version of their A.S.I.A song You Raise Me Up.

Member

Discography

Studio albums

Extended plays

Singles

Promotional Singles

Media appearances

TV Appearance

Filmography

Web dramas

Group Variety Show

Awards

Concert and tours 

 Produce Pandas A.S.I.A first time singing concert "熊猫堂ProducePandas A.S.I.A 感恩首唱会"  - 2020
 We are The One Produce Pandas debut 1st anniversary concert "We are The One 熊猫堂一周年演唱会"    - 2021
 Produce Pandas EMO了 National concert tour "熊猫堂 EMO了 全国巡回演唱会"   - 2021
Shanghai
Guangzhou

References

External links 
 Produce Pandas Official YouTube Channel
 Produce Pandas Official Twitter Account

Chinese boy bands
Mandopop musical groups
Chinese pop music groups
Chinese dance music groups
Mandarin-language singers
Musical groups established in 2020
2020 establishments in China